Nancy Warren may refer to:

 Nancy Warren (author), author of romance novels
 Nancy Warren (politician), member of the New Hampshire House of Representatives
 Nancy Warren (baseball) (1921–2001), pitcher and infielder